Celaenorrhinus pyrrha, commonly known as the double spotted flat, is a species of hesperiid butterfly found in South Asia.

Range
The butterfly occurs in India, Bhutan, Myanmar, Laos, and the Malay Peninsula. In India, the butterfly ranges from Kumaon (Uttarakhand) to Sikkim, Bhutan and eastwards towards Myanmar.

Status
It was described by William Harry Evans as not being rare.

Cited references

See also
Hesperiidae
List of butterflies of India (Hesperiidae)

References

Print

Online

pyrrha
Butterflies of Asia
Butterflies of Indochina